Debabarrena–Gipuzkoa was a Basque professional cycling team, which competeed in elite road bicycle racing events such as the UCI Women's Road World Cup.

National & Continental Champions
2008
 Spain Road Race, Itxaso Leunda Coni
2010
 Spain Time Trial, Leire Olaberria Dorronsoro
 Spain Road Race, Leire Olaberria Dorronsoro

References

Defunct cycling teams based in Spain
UCI Women's Teams
Cycling teams established in 2008
Cycling teams disestablished in 2012
2008 establishments in Spain
2012 disestablishments in Spain